WH, W.H., or wh may refer to:

Arts and entertainment
 Mr. W.H., a mysterious dedication in Shakespeare's sonnets
 Whitney Houston (1963-2012), American singer

Language
 wh (digraph), in when, etc.
 Voiceless labio-velar approximant, the sound used for the above when it is pronounced differently from w
 Pronunciation of English ⟨wh⟩
 wh-word, a name for an interrogative word such as where and when
 wh-movement, a syntactic phenomenon involving such words
 wh-question, a question formed using such words

Places
 County Westmeath, Ireland, vehicle registration code
 The White House, United States, official residence and workplace of the president of the United States, also a metonym for the president and/or his/her/their office

Other uses 
 Watt-hour, a unit of energy
 China Northwest Airlines, IATA airline code
 Wardlaw-Hartridge School, W-H
 Wyndham Hotels & Resorts, NYSE Stock Symbol
 WH Group, Chinese meat and food processing company